Jim Morgan ( 13 June 1943 - 19 October 2005) was an Australian rugby league footballer who played in the 1960s and 1970s.

Morgan was born in Maitland, New South Wales on 13 June 1943., Morgan first came to prominence as a rugby league footballer in 1964 when playing for a representative Newcastle team that defeated premiers St. George on their way to winning that year's State Cup. The following year he was signed with South Sydney to play in the Sydney Premiership. In his first season with the Rabbitohs, he played in their Grand Final loss to St. George.

References

Sources
https://web.archive.org/web/20080820025500/http://maitland.yourguide.com.au/news/local/sport/rugby-league/hall-of-fame-for-maitland-rugby-league-stalwart/772891.aspx
http://www.yesterdayshero.com.au/PlayerProfile_Jim-Morgan_5884.aspx
https://web.archive.org/web/20120919144039/http://news.ninemsn.com.au/article.aspx?id=67847
https://web.archive.org/web/20080728222907/http://www.nrlstats.com/archive/players.cfm?PlayerID=5016

1943 births
2005 deaths
Australia national rugby league team players
Australian rugby league players
Country New South Wales rugby league team players
Maitland Pickers players
New South Wales rugby league team players
Rugby league players from Maitland, New South Wales
Rugby league props
South Sydney Rabbitohs players
Sydney Roosters players